The Wulka is a river of Burgenland, Austria.

The river springs near Forchtenstein and the border to Lower Austria.

An article in the Journal of Hydrology stated that "Waste water treatment plants contributed up to 68% of monthly flow of River Wulka into the lake."

See also 
 Rosalia Mountains

References 

Rivers of Austria
Rivers of Burgenland
Tourist attractions in Burgenland